Claude-Antoine de Bermen de La Martinière (12 July 1700 – 24 December 1761) was a Quebec-born son of Claude de Bermen de la Martinière.

de Bermen became an officer in the colonial regular troops. He enjoyed a career marked by important assignment and recognition of his efforts were marked by his receipt of the Order of Saint-Louis. Two important assignments highlighted his career. In 1737, he was appointed commander of Fort La Baye, (now Green Bay, Wisconsin). In 1751, he commanded Fort Beauséjour during its construction.

References 
 
 

People of New France
1700 births
1761 deaths